Gayety Comedies are a comedy film series released made in the United States during the silent film era. They debuted in 1919 and were distributed to various film exchanges
 Al Christie produced them. The studio that made them was owned by E. H. Emmick and J. L. Friedman and was on the corner of Sunset Boulevard and Gower Street.

George Ovey and Lillian Brion featured in several. Brion had previously acted in Vogue Comedies. Billy Bletcher and Vera Reynolds were added to keep up with production demand.

The production company was active in 1919 and 1920.

Fiomography
Dropped into Scandal
Are Flirts Foolish?
Dark and Cloudy (1919)
Fireman, Save My Gal!, extant
Dry and Thirsty
Ladies Must Dance (1920)
Say Uncle
Afraid of His Wife
Oh, Brother
Wild and Willie
Assault and Flattery
Standing Pat

References

American silent films
Comedy film series
Film series introduced in 1919